Toynami is an American toy company based in Van Nuys, California. Founded in 2000 by George Sohn, Toynami is primarily focused on anime licenses for specialty retailers and collectors in the North American market. The company's name is a portmanteau of the words "toy" and "tsunami".

Part of the early driving force that led to the creation of the company was Sohn's interest in producing and releasing modern Macross Valkyrie toys, something he spearheaded with Japanese company Yamato Toys while being vice president of Toycom, Yamato's U.S. division at the time. When legal issues arose blocking the non-grey market release of Yamato's Macross toys in North America, Sohn left Toycom and started Toynami, first acquiring the Robotech license, which was the catalyst that roadblocked Yamato and Toycom's Macross toys.

Using Robotech as a starting point, Toynami has since expanded, seeking other primarily anime-based licenses and aiming more towards collectors instead of the mass-market.

Criticism
Toynami's reputation has been mixed since its inception, with the criticism of the company focused on overall quality. In 2001, the company advertised their Robotech Masterpiece Collection VF-1 Veritech Fighter toys as having approximately 33% diecast content. After several months of delays, the line's first model - VF-1J Rick Hunter - was released in the Summer of 2002, sans the promised diecast metal content as solicited. Other collectors were infuriated when their $3,000 Robotech Super Scale statues (which stand over 5' tall), were delivered with broken parts and substandard paint quality.

Following several complaints from collectors, Toynami issued a recall notice of their Robotech Masterpiece Collection Maia Shadow Fighter in January 2009. According to the company's statement, a new factory was commissioned to manufacture the toy, which was discovered to not meet quality control standards. Within the 60-day period from the recall notice, Toynami offered a full refund for every unit returned.

Present licenses

Anime
Bleach
Macross (U.S. Market via Harmony Gold USA)
Naruto
Naruto Shippuden
Robotech
Shogun Warriors (Beast King GoLion and Armored Fleet Dairugger XV)

Non-anime
Acid Rain
The Canmans
Futurama
Hello Sanrio
Mameshiba
Skelanimals
So So Happy
UNKL
SpongeBob SquarePants
Godzilla

Past licenses

Anime
Chobits
Inuyasha
Serial Experiments Lain
Speed Racer
Voltron

Non-anime
The Chop Chops
The Deviants
Dynomutt
Emily the Strange
Harvey Birdman, Attorney at Law
The Herculoids
Precious Miseries
Thundarr the Barbarian

References

External links
Official Toynami Site

Toy companies of the United States
Manufacturing companies based in Los Angeles